Unbreakable is the fourth release by straight edge hardcore punk band Down to Nothing. It was released on February 19, 2008. The Album is mainly a composition of recorded material prior to the band's 2007 album The Most.

Track listing 
Save It for the Birds 1:09
One Eighty  1:48
The Normal People  1:53
Outcome  2:28
Choke Louder  1:09
3 or 4 Years :44
Pet Peeve :29
Who Are You to Say  1:58
Honorable Mention Mr. Starky  2:15
What Goes Around Comes Around  2:53
Fire Escape  3:18
Go Ahead Wit Yo' Fake Ass  :51
Us V Each Other  1:49
I Can't Believe My Eyes 2:29
Smash It :54
Burn III  1:55
Unbreakable  2:22
Home Sweet Home  1:40
We're on the Run 1:53
Risk It :56
Skate & Annoy, Vol. 2.0 (Sk8 or Die) :11
I'm So Lucky 4:20

Personnel
Production

 Gary Llama – recording (Tracks 18-22)

Reception 
Punknews.org said the album's that the tracks were taken off from and the album itself was "still a solid listen and a handy way to scope the band's back catalog."

References 

2008 albums
Down to Nothing albums